The New Westminster Bridge (also known as the New Westminster Rail Bridge (NSRW) or the Fraser River Swing Bridge) is a swing bridge that crosses the Fraser River and connects New Westminster with Surrey, British Columbia, Canada.

The bridge is owned by the Government of Canada, operated and maintained by the Canadian National Railway, with the Southern Railway of British Columbia (SRY), Canadian Pacific Railway, and BNSF Railway having track usage rights, as do Amtrak's Cascades
(with service to Portland and Seattle) and Via Rail's The Canadian (with service to Toronto).

History

The New Westminster Bridge was constructed in 1904 and formally opened on July 23 by the Lieutenant governor of British Columbia.<ref name=":1"  It was originally built with two decks; the lower deck was used for rail traffic while the upper deck was used for automobile traffic.

Crossing the river prior to the construction of the New Westminster Bridge required using the K de K ferry which would dock at the present day neighbourhood of South Westminster (formerly the historic community of Brownsville) located in the city of Surrey.

The toll for the upper bridge was 25 cents and created quite an uproar for farmers who found out quickly that by taking their livestock across on foot would cost them a quarter a head but if they put them in a truck it cost a quarter for the whole load.

The bridge was the preferred method of transport across the Fraser until the opening of the Pattullo Bridge in 1937. The upper deck was removed and the bridge was converted exclusively for rail use. On May 29, 1982, a significant fire broke out on the New Westminster Bridge. On November 28, 1987, a barge struck the bridge. The resulting legal action of  Canadian National Railway Co. v. Norsk Pacific Steamship Co. became a leading Supreme Court of Canada decision.

See also
 List of crossings of the Fraser River
 List of bridges in Canada

References

External links

Archival photos of the bridge from the New Westminster Public Library

Railway bridges in British Columbia
Swing bridges in Canada
Bridges in Greater Vancouver
Bridges completed in 1904
Bridges over the Fraser River
Buildings and structures in New Westminster
Buildings and structures in Surrey, British Columbia
Former toll bridges in Canada